Round Trip is the debut album by former TNT singer Tony Harnell, released on July 2, 2010, credited to Tony Harnell & The Mercury Train. Although it is considered a solo album, Harnell says this is not his solo album but rather a project, while his debut solo album is yet to be released.

The album is a collection re-recordings of classic Harnell songs from his previous bands TNT and Westworld, in a new stripped-down acoustic form, along with a new song recorded especially for this release - "Anywhere But Here".

Track 12, "When I'm Away," is listed in the liner notes as a bonus track.
Some copies had a sticker on the cover which mistakenly advertised songs by Starbreaker being included.

Track listing

Personnel
 Tony Harnell – lead vocals
The Mercury Train
 Jason Hagen – acoustic guitar, ukulele
 Chris Foley – electric guitar
 Brandon Wilde - bass, vocals
 Brad Gunyon - drums, percussion
 Amy Harnell - vocals, descant recorder
Additional personnel
 Sandi Saraya - guest vocals on "Shame"

 Tony Harnell – lead vocals
The wildflowers
 Ron Bumblefoot – guitar, vocals
 Amy Harnell - vocals, descant recorder
 Cassandra Sotos - violin
 Jason Hagen – acoustic guitar,

References

2010 debut albums
Tony Harnell albums